Rashid Mamatkulovich Rakhimov; born 18 March 1965) is Tajikistani professional football manager and a former player.

Playing career

Club
Much of Rakhimov's playing career is related to Pamir Dushanbe, where he was playing from 1980 to 1991, the last three seasons in Soviet Top League. After that he moved on to playing in such clubs as Spartak Moscow, Real Valladolid, Lokomotiv Moscow. In the later part of his career as a footballer he moved to Austria, playing for FK Austria Wien, Admira Wacker and SV Ried, where he was very popular with fans.

International
Rakhimov played 4 matches for Russian national football team during 1994–1995. Rakhimov played for the football team of his country of birth Tajikistan national football team in 1992 and 1996.

Management career
After he finished playing, he was invited to struggling Admira Wacker as a manager in 2002. He saved the club from relegation, but quit in 2004.

In 2006, he was invited to FC Amkar Perm, which was also facing relegation. After an impressive run of performances, Amkar stayed in Premier League, and Rakhimov signed a 2-year contract with the club in the beginning of 2007 season.

On 6 December 2007, he signed a 3-year contract with FC Lokomotiv Moscow and was fired on 28 April 2009. After nineteen months, he returned to Amkar Perm.

On 28 September 2011 Amkar Perm president Gennady Shilov confirmed that the club had accepted Rakhimov's resignation.

On 5 September 2018, he rejoined FC Akhmat Grozny (the team was called Terek during his previous time at the club). He resigned from Akhmat on 30 September 2019 with club in 15th place. In 2016–17 season, he sent Akhmat to 5th place, which is still the highest ever record in the club's history.

On 11 October 2020, Rakhimov was appointed as head coach of FC Ufa. He resigned from Ufa on 3 April 2021, following a 0–4 loss to FC Dynamo Moscow, with the club still in the same relegation-zone 15th place it was in when Rakhimov took over as manager.

Honours
Spartak Moscow
Russian Top League (2): 1992, 1994

References

External links
 
 
 

1965 births
Living people
Soviet footballers
CSKA Pamir Dushanbe players
FC Spartak Moscow players
Russian Premier League players
FC Lokomotiv Moscow players
Real Valladolid players
FK Austria Wien players
Tajikistani footballers
Tajikistani football managers
Tajikistani expatriate sportspeople in Spain
Tajikistani expatriate footballers
Tajikistani expatriate football managers
Russian footballers
Russia international footballers
Russian football managers
Russian expatriate football managers
Tajikistani emigrants to Russia
Soviet Top League players
Segunda División players
Russian Premier League managers
Expatriate football managers in Austria
FC Admira Wacker Mödling managers
FC Amkar Perm managers
FC Lokomotiv Moscow managers
FC Akhmat Grozny managers
FC Ufa managers
Tajikistan international footballers
Dual internationalists (football)
Sportspeople from Dushanbe
Association football midfielders